Raymond John Groom  (born 3 September 1944) is an Australian lawyer and former sportsman and politician, representing the Liberal Party in the Federal Parliament 1975–84 and the Tasmanian Parliament 1986–2001.  He was a Federal and state minister for a total of 13 years.  He was Premier of Tasmania from 1992 to 1996 and also served as Deputy Premier and Attorney-General.

Early life
Ray Groom was born in Elsternwick, a suburb of Melbourne.  His family moved to Tasmania when he was a young child.  He attended schools in both Victoria and Tasmania.

Australian rules football career

He initially played senior Australian rules football in Tasmania with the Cooee Football Club commencing at 16 years of age.  He represented the North Western Football Union and Tasmania before joining the Victorian Football League (VFL) club Melbourne in 1963. He played 96 senior games with Melbourne at centre half forward, as a ruck rover and at centre half back. On Ron Barassi's retirement, Groom was invited by Melbourne coach Norm Smith to wear the club's prized Number 31 guernsey. He represented Victoria and won the Keith 'Bluey' Truscott Medal as Melbourne's Best and Fairest player in 1968. Groom later represented Tasmania at the 1969 National Carnival in Adelaide.

Playing statistics

|- style="background-color: #EAEAEA"
! scope="row" style="text-align:center" | 1963
|
| 15 || 19 || 17 ||  ||  ||  ||  ||  ||  ||  || 0.9 ||  ||  ||  ||  ||  ||  || 
|-
! scope="row" style="text-align:center" | 1964
|
| 15 || 12 || 9 ||  ||  ||  ||  ||  ||  ||  || 0.8 ||  ||  ||  ||  ||  ||  || 
|- style="background-color: #EAEAEA"
! scope="row" style="text-align:center" | 1965
|
| 31 || 8 || 2 || 5 || 52 || 20 || 72 || 18 ||  ||  || 0.3 || 0.6 || 6.5 || 2.5 || 9.0 || 2.3 ||  || 
|-
! scope="row" style="text-align:center" | 1966
|
| 31 || 16 || 7 || 9 || 181 || 47 || 228 || 50 ||  || 80 || 0.4 || 0.6 || 11.3 || 2.9 || 14.3 || 3.1 ||  || 5.3
|- style="background-color: #EAEAEA"
! scope="row" style="text-align:center" | 1967
|
| 31 || 18 || 1 || 2 || 212 || 42 || 254 || 71 ||  || 136 || 0.1 || 0.1 || 11.8 || 2.3 || 14.1 || 3.9 ||  || 7.6
|-
! scope="row" style="text-align:center" | 1968
|
| 31 || 19 || 0 || 0 || 246 || 28 || 274 || 76 ||  || 34 || 0.0 || 0.0 || 12.9 || 1.5 || 14.4 || 4.0 ||  || 1.9
|- class="sortbottom"
! colspan=3| Career
! 92
! 36
! 16
! 691
! 137
! 828
! 215
! 
! 250
! 0.4
! 0.3
! 11.3
! 2.2
! 13.6
! 3.5
! 
! 4.9
|}

Athletics
He won state titles in both Tasmania and Victoria as a sprinter and long jumper. In 1962, at 18 years of age, he represented Tasmania at the National Athletics Championships in Sydney, was a nationally ranked athlete and was chosen as a member of the Australian Commonwealth Games selection squad.

Early legal career
After obtaining a Bachelor of Laws from the University of Melbourne in 1967 he practised as a barrister and solicitor in Melbourne and later in Tasmania.  He was a partner in the Tasmanian firm of Crisp, Hudson & Mann and appeared regularly in the Supreme Court of Tasmania on trial and appeal matters and the Magistrates Courts.

Political career

Federal politics
Groom first stood for the House of Representatives seat of Braddon in 1974 at the age of 30 but was unsuccessful. In 1975 he ran for Braddon again and won, and held it until 1984.  His 1975 election result was significant in that as a Liberal candidate he outpolled a Labor opponent on the West Coast of Tasmania, the first time this had ever occurred. In the 1974 and 1983 Australian federal elections, he achieved the largest swing of any Liberal candidate in the nation.  Between the election of 1974 and his last election in 1983, the Liberal two-party vote in Braddon increased from 38% to 63%.

He served in the second Fraser Ministry as Minister for Environment, Housing and Community Development from December 1977 to December 1978 and then Minister for Housing and Construction until November 1980.

He retired from the Australian Parliament immediately prior to the 1984 election.

State politics
He and his family moved from Burnie to Hobart at the end of 1984 and he was then appointed senior advisor to the Tasmanian Premier Robin Gray.

In 1986 he re-entered politics as a member for Denison in the Tasmanian House of Assembly, topping the poll in that electorate.  He immediately became the Minister for Forests, Mines and Sea Fisheries.  In November 1988, he became deputy leader of the state Liberal Party and hence Deputy Premier of Tasmania.  He became deputy opposition leader after the Liberals' defeat in 1989. In 1991, he successfully challenged Gray's leadership and became Tasmanian state leader of the Liberal Party.

Tasmanian Premier

Groom became Premier of Tasmania after leading the Liberals to victory in the 1992 state election with a majority of 19 seats on a swing of over seven percent.

After the 1996 election, the Liberals suffered a three-seat swing, losing their majority.  The balance of power rested with the Australian Greens, but the Labor Party refused to enter into any agreement with them.  This left a Liberal minority government supported by the Greens as the only realistic option.  However, Groom had promised before the election that he would only govern in majority and resigned.  He was replaced by Tony Rundle, who quickly reached an agreement with the Greens.  He remained in Parliament until 2001, serving as Attorney-General, Minister for Tourism and Minister for Workplace Standards until the 1998 election, when the Rundle Government was defeated.

Life after politics
Groom is actively involved in community affairs and has been a chairman/director of several community organisations since retiring from politics.  He is a former Chairman of Southern Cross Care Tasmania and Southern Cross Care Australia.

Since retiring from parliament, he has practised as a barrister and solicitor and as an arbitrator and mediator. He was appointed a Deputy President of the Australian Administrative Appeals Tribunal in 2004 and continues in that position.  He is currently a member of the Tribunal's Executive Deputy Presidents Committee and the Practice and Procedure Committee.

Honours
In the 2010 Australia Day Honours, he was appointed an Officer (AO) of the Order of Australia "For service to the Parliament of Tasmania as Premier and through a range of portfolio responsibilities, and to the community through leadership roles within organisations supporting Indigenous, aged and welfare groups".

Personal life
He is married to Gillian Crisp and they have four sons and two daughters.  One of his sons Matthew Groom also served as a member of the Tasmanian parliament until 2018

References

External links
 Demonwiki profile
 

1944 births
Living people
Australian rules footballers from Melbourne
Deputy Premiers of Tasmania
Liberal Party of Australia members of the Parliament of Australia
Liberal Party of Australia members of the Parliament of Tasmania
Melbourne Football Club players
Keith 'Bluey' Truscott Trophy winners
Members of the Australian House of Representatives
Members of the Australian House of Representatives for Braddon
Premiers of Tasmania
Members of the Tasmanian House of Assembly
Melbourne Law School alumni
Australian sportsperson-politicians
Officers of the Order of Australia
Recipients of the Centenary Medal
Australian rules footballers from Tasmania
Cooee Football Club players
Leaders of the Opposition in Tasmania
Treasurers of Tasmania
Tasmanian Football Hall of Fame inductees
21st-century Australian politicians
20th-century Australian politicians
People from Elsternwick, Victoria